Philip Bond Fouke (January 23, 1818 – October 3, 1876) was a U.S. Representative from Illinois.

Biography
Born in Kaskaskia, Illinois, Fouke attended the public schools and became a civil engineer.
He established and published the Belleville Advocate in 1841.
He studied law.
He was admitted to the bar in 1845 and commenced practice in Belleville.
He served as prosecuting attorney for the Kaskaskia district (second circuit) 1846–1850.
He served as member of the State house of representatives in 1851.
He unsuccessfully contested the election of Lyman Trumbull to the Thirty-fourth Congress.

Fouke was elected as a Democrat to the Thirty-sixth and Thirty-seventh Congresses (March 4, 1859 – March 3, 1863).
He was not a candidate for renomination in 1862.
During the Civil War he served as colonel of the 30th Illinois Volunteer Infantry and was wounded at the Battle of Belmont.

After the war, he engaged in the practice of law in Washington, D.C., and died there October 3, 1876. He was interred in the Congressional Cemetery.

References
 Retrieved on 2008-02-14

External links

1818 births
1876 deaths
Union Army colonels
People of Illinois in the American Civil War
Burials at the Congressional Cemetery
Democratic Party members of the United States House of Representatives from Illinois
19th-century American politicians
People from Kaskaskia, Illinois